The 1955 Limerick Senior Hurling Championship was the 61st staging of the Limerick Senior Hurling Championship since its establishment by the Limerick County Board in 1887.

Cappamore were the defending champions.

Ahane won the championship after a 2-05 to 0-05 defeat of Geraldines in the final. It was their 16th championship title overall and their first title since 1948.

References

Limerick Senior Hurling Championship
Limerick Senior Hurling Championship